Abieta-7,13-dien-18-al dehydrogenase (abietadienal dehydrogenase (ambiguous)) is an enzyme with systematic name abieta-7,13-dien-18-al:NAD+ oxidoreductase. This enzyme catalyses the following chemical reaction

 abieta-7,13-dien-18-al + H2O + NAD+  abieta-7,13-dien-18-oate + NADH + H+

This enzyme catalyses the last step of the pathway of abietic acid biosynthesis in Abies grandis.

References

External links 
 

EC 1.2.1